Ferenc Doór (14 June 1918 – 10 July 2015) was a Hungarian painter and graphic artist, "The lover of the Danube and Szentendre".

Life 
He was born in Petrilla, Transylvania on June 14, 1918. Between 1938 and 1941 he studied on the Hungarian University of Fine Arts in Budapest under the István Szőnyi's hands. After the World War II he suffered a captivity of war in Siberia for three years. After his release terminated his study in 1949, as instructor (assistant professor) of Szőnyi involved in the circulation of Hungarian artistic life. In 1957 he became a member of the Art Fund of Fine Arts Association.

By the Nagybánya's painting lessons continued painting with natural themes and human figures appear rich color scheme, has joined forces shaping a balanced composition. Oil paintings and water-like substance, were the main elements his expression of color and light.

As from his works himself wrote: "I tried my work faithfully follow art my ideas - to capture the potential of everyday life images of beauty - small joys and sorrows, our time and the change of a landscape typical timeless atmosphere of human destinies".

He died in his Szentendre home at the age of 97 years on 10 July 2015.

Exhibitions 
He had numerous exhibitions in Hungary and abroad, worked for decades in Szentendre and the creative community of artists houses in Szigliget, Kecskemét, Hódmezővásárhely and Mártély.
In the 1950s onward featured in the Hall of Art, Budapest a common ones and in other exhibition spaces in the country.

Individual 
 1959 • Fényes Adolf Terem, Budapest
 1965, 1971, 1983 • Derkovits Terem, Budapest
 1974 • Zalaegerszeg
 1979 • Nyíregyháza
 1975, 1976 • Galleria Antelami, Bologna
 1972 • Galerie Glaub, Cologne
 1975, 1978 • Parma
 1990 • Csók Gallery, Budapest
 1993 • Művelődési Ház, Dunaföldvár

In group 
 Műcsarnok országos tárlatai
 Hall of Art, Budapest
 Vásárhelyi Őszi Tárlatok, Hódmezővásárhely
 Szegedi Nyári Tárlatok
 Hatvani Biennálék
 Humor and Cartoon, Gabrovo

Works in galleries 
 Hungarian National Gallery, Budapest
 Déri Museum, Debrecen
 Sárospataki Múzeum, Sárospatak
 Gabrovo
 Plovdiv
 Sozopol

Prizes 
In 2011, he became the Hungarian Gold Cross of Merit honors.

Literature 
 Doór, Ferenc: Autobiography, 1998
 Artportal.hu

Notes 

Hungarian painters
People from Petrila
1918 births
2015 deaths
Hungarian military personnel of World War II
Hungarian prisoners of war
World War II prisoners of war held by the Soviet Union
Romanian emigrants to Hungary